Sara López Suárez (born 16 January 2002) is a Spanish footballer who plays as a midfielder for Granadilla.

Club career
López started her career at Femarguín.

References

External links
Profile at La Liga

2002 births
Living people
Women's association football midfielders
Spanish women's footballers
Footballers from Las Palmas
UD Granadilla Tenerife players
Primera División (women) players
Segunda Federación (women) players